Blake David Annen (born May 28, 1991) is an American football coach and former tight end. He played college football at the University of Cincinnati and attended Upper Arlington High School in Upper Arlington, Ohio. He has been a member of the Philadelphia Eagles, Chicago Bears, New Orleans Saints, Green Bay Packers and Buffalo Bills.

Early years
Annen played high school football for the Upper Arlington High School Golden Bears in Upper Arlington, Ohio. He helped the Golden Bears win the Ohio Capital Conference Central Division Championship in 2008. He recorded 30 receptions for 800 yards and 12 touchdowns in his high school career. He was named the top tight end in the state by OhioVarsity.com.

College career
Annen played for the Cincinnati Bearcats from 2009 to 2013. He was redshirted in 2009.

Professional career

Annen ran his 40-yard dash time at 4.41 seconds at Cincinnati's 2014 Pro Day in addition to posting 25 reps on the bench press, which ultimately made him a priority UDFA.

Philadelphia Eagles
Annen signed with the Philadelphia Eagles on May 10, 2014 after going undrafted in the 2014 NFL draft. He was released by the Eagles on August 23, 2014.

Chicago Bears
Annen was signed to the Chicago Bears' practice squad on September 18, 2014. He was promoted to the active roster on November 8, 2014. He made his NFL debut on November 23, 2014 against the Tampa Bay Buccaneers. Annen was released by the Bears on September 2, 2015.

New Orleans Saints
On September 7, 2015, the New Orleans Saints signed Annen to their practice squad. On September 15, 2015, he was released by the Saints.

Green Bay Packers
On September 30, 2015, the Green Bay Packers signed Annen to their practice squad. On October 16, 2015, he was released by the Packers.

Buffalo Bills
On December 15, 2015, the Buffalo Bills signed Annen to their practice squad. He was waived/injured by the Bills on September 2, 2016 and was placed on injured reserve after clearing waivers.

On June 13, 2017, Annen was waived by the Bills.

Post-playing career
In 2018, Annen was hired as the head football coach at Carmel High School. As assistant coaches, he hired former Bears Johnny Knox and Nathan Vasher; the three had worked together at EFT Football Academy in Highland Park, Illinois. In Annen's first year, the Corsairs improved from their 1–8 record in 2017 to 4–5. Another ex-Bear in Jason McKie became running backs coach in 2019. Annen resigned in October to return to his family in Ohio.

References

External links
NFL Draft Scout
College stats

Living people
1991 births
Players of American football from Ohio
People from Upper Arlington, Ohio
American football tight ends
Cincinnati Bearcats football players
Philadelphia Eagles players
Chicago Bears players
New Orleans Saints players
Green Bay Packers players
Buffalo Bills players